Ferté is a surname of French origin, meaning fortress or bastion. Notable people with the surname include:

Alain Ferté (born 1955), French racing driver
Denis-Pierre-Jean Papillon de la Ferté (1727—1794), French civil servant
Henri de La Ferté-Senneterre (1599–1681), French military governor and Marshal of France
Hue de la Ferté (fl. 1220–1235), French trouvère
Jean Charles de la Ferté (1685–1771), French aristocrat, diplomat, and Marshal of France
Jeanne-Françoise Juchereau de la Ferté de Saint-Ignace (1650–1723), Québécois nun
Michel Ferté (1958–2023), French racing driver
Philip Joubert de la Ferté (1887–1965), British Royal Air Force commander
René Ferté (1903–1958), Swiss actor
Stephen of La Ferté (fl. c. 1128–1130), French priest and Latin patriarch of Jerusalem

See also
La Ferté, list of place names

French-language surnames